Rhinoceros is a 1974 American comedy film based on the play Rhinocéros by Eugène Ionesco. The film was produced by Ely Landau for the American Film Theatre, which presented thirteen film adaptations of plays in the United States from 1973 to 1975.

Plot
The residents of a large town are inexplicably turning into rhinoceroses. Stanley (Gene Wilder), a mild-mannered office clerk, watches the bizarre transformations from a bemused distance. But soon the strange occurrences invade his personal space, as his neighbor and best friend John (Zero Mostel) and his girlfriend Daisy (Karen Black) become part of the human-into-rhinoceros metamorphosis that is taking place. Eventually, Stanley realizes he will be the only human left. Not willing to give in and transform, he instead climbs atop his apartment building and shouts down in defiance.

Cast

 Zero Mostel as John
 Gene Wilder as Stanley
 Karen Black as Daisy
 Joe Silver as Norman
 Robert Weil as Carl
 Marilyn Chris as Mrs. Bingham
 Percy Rodrigues as Mr. Nicholson
 Robert Fields as Young Man
 Melody Santangello as Young Woman
 Don Calfa as Waiter
 Lou Cutell as Cashier
 Howard Morton as Doctor
 Manuel Aviles as Busboy
 Anne Ramsey as Lady with Cat
 Lorna Thayer as Restaurant Owner

Production
In adapting Ionesco’s play, several changes were made to the original text. The setting was switched from France to a contemporary United States, complete with a photograph of President Richard Nixon that was comically venerated and the lead characters Bérenger and Jean were renamed Stanley and John.  A new music score by Galt MacDermot was created for the film and a dream sequence was added to the story. Tom O'Horgan, a theater director best known for his staging of the original Broadway production of the musical Hair, directed Rhinoceros. Zero Mostel, who starred in the 1961 Broadway production of the play, recreated his role as the man who turns into a Rhinoceros. Mostel created a minor brouhaha during the production when he refused to smash any props during the rehearsal of his transformation scene – the actor claimed he had an aversion to destroying property. Although O'Horgan considered using a live animal to dramatize the transformation, no rhinoceros is ever seen on camera during the film – shadows and POV camera angles are used to suggest the presence of the animals. Mostel and Wilder had appeared together in The Producers (1968).

Reception
Rhinoceros was poorly received when it had its theatrical release as part of the American Film Theatre series. Jay Cocks, reviewing Rhinoceros for Time magazine, faulted it for its "upbeat, frantic vulgarization" of the Ionesco text, arguing that O’Horgan "removed not only the politics but the resonance as well. What remains is a squeaky sermon on the virtues of nonconformity". Vincent Canby, writing in The New York Times, dismissed the film as "an unreliable mouthpiece in an unreliable metaphor so grossly overdirected by Tom O'Horgan that you might get the idea Mr. O'Horgan thought he was making a movie for an audience made up entirely of rhinoceroses instead of people".

See also
 List of American films of 1974

References

External links

 
 

1974 films
1974 comedy films
American films based on plays
Apocalyptic films
Films about rhinoceroses
Films about shapeshifting
Films produced by Ely Landau
1970s English-language films